This list of Christian schools in India contains schools from all the Christian denominations.

Andhra Pradesh 

 St. Xavier's High School, Darsi
 Timpany School

Assam 

 Don Bosco High School, Guwahati, Assam
 Don Bosco High School, Hojai
 JD Williams English School, Tukrajhar, Chirang, BTAD, Assam
 St. Mary's High School, North Lakhimpur

Bihar 

 Ark International School, Begusarai
 Khrist Raja High School, Bettiah
 Loyola High School, Patna
 Notre Dame Academy, Patna
 St. Joseph's Convent High School, Patna
 St. Michael's High School, Patna
 St. Paul's High School, Hajipur
 St. Xavier's High School, Patna
 St. Xavier's Higher Secondary School, Bettiah
 Watson High School, Madhubani

Goa 

 Loyola High School (Goa)
 Mount Mary's Higher Secondary School
 Regina Martyrum High School
 SFX High School, Goa
 St. Britto High School, Mapusa
 St. Mary's Convent High School, Goa
 St. Xavier's High School, Velim, Goa

Gujarat 

 St. Xavier's, Adipur
 St. Xavier's High School, Gandhinagar
 St. Xavier's High School, Jamnagar
 St. Xavier's High School, Mirzapur
 St. Xavier's High School, Surat

Haryana 

 Convent of Jesus and Mary, Ambala
 St. Crispin's Senior Secondary School

Himachal Pradesh

 Bishop Cotton School (Shimla)
 Loreto Convent, Tara Hall, Shimla
 St. Edward's School, Shimla
 St. Luke's Senior Secondary School
 St. Mary's Convent School, Kasauli

Jammu and Kashmir

 Burn Hall School
 Presentation Convent Higher Secondary School, Srinagar
 Presentation Convent Senior Secondary School, Jammu
 St. Francis Higher Secondary School, Akhnoor
 St. Joseph's School (Baramulla)
 St. Peter's High School, India
 St. Peter’s Higher Secondary School, Karan Bagh
 Tyndale Biscoe School

Jharkhand

 Bishop Westcott Boys' School
 Bishop Westcott Girls' School (Ranchi)
 Carmel Junior College
 Carmel School Digwadih
 Carmel School, Madhupur
 Carmel School, Giridih
 De Nobili School, Bhuli
 De Nobili School CTPS, Bokaro
 De Nobili School, CMRI
 De Nobili School, FRI
 De Nobili School, Koradih
 De Nobili School, Maithon
 De Nobili School, Mugma
 De Nobili School, Sindri
 Loyola School, Jamshedpur
 The Pentecostal Assembly School, Bokaro
 Sacred Heart Convent School (Jamshedpur)
 St. John's High School, Ranchi
 St. Thomas School, Ranchi
 St. Xavier's School, Hazaribagh 
 St. Xavier's School (Bokaro)
 St. Xavier's School, Ranchi

Karnataka

Bangalore
* Baldwin Boys' High School
 Baldwin Girls High School
 Bishop Cotton Boys' School
 Bishop Cotton Girls' School
 Cathedral High School, Bangalore
 Christ School, Bangalore
 Clarence High School (India)
 Cluny Convent High School, Malleswaram
 The Frank Anthony Public School, Bangalore
 Goodwill's Girls' School, Bangalore
 Sophia High School
 St. Germain High School
 St. John's High School, Bangalore
 St. Joseph's Boys' High School, Bangalore
 St. Joseph's Indian High School
 United Mission School

Belgaum

 St. Paul's School
 St. Mary's School, Belgaum

Mangalore

 Basel Evangelical School
 Carmel School
 Cascia High School
 Lourdes Central School
 Milagres School
 Mount Carmel Central School
 Rosario High School
 Sacred Hearts' School
 St. Ann's High School
 St. Gerosa High School
 St Theresa’s School

Manvi

Xavier School

Kerala 

 AKJM Public School, Kanjirappally
 Auxilium ISC School, Kottiyam
 BEM High School, Parappanangadi
 Bishop Moore Vidyapith Cherthala
 Bishop Moore Vidyapith, Kayamkulam
 Bishop Moore Vidyapith Mavelikkara
 Chaldean Syrian Higher Secondary School, Thrissur
 Christ Nagar School, Thiruvananthapuram
 Church Missionary Society College High School
 Santa Cruz HSS, Fort Kochi
 St. Mary's Residential Central School
 St. Mary's Higher Secondary School, Thiruvananthapuram
 St. Michael's School, Kannur
 St Peters School, Kadayiruppu
 St. Paul's High School, Veliyanad
 St Stephens School, Pathanapuram
 St. Teresa's Convent Girls' Higher Secondary School
 St. Thomas Convent School, Palakkad
 St. Thomas Higher Secondary School, Kozhencherry
 St. Thomas Residential School
 Vimalagiri Public School

Maharashtra 

 Barnes School
 The Bishop's School (Pune)
 Bombay Scottish School, Mahim
 Bombay Scottish School, Powai
 Campion School, Mumbai
 Cardinal Gracias High School
 Carmelite Convent English High School
 Cathedral and John Connon School
 Cathedral Vidya School (Lonavala)
 Christ Academy
 Christ Church School
 Christ Jyoti Convent High School, Chiplun
 Fort Convent School, Mumbai
 Holy Family High School (Mumbai)
 Loyola High School (Pune)
 Mount Carmel Convent School (Pune)
 Our Lady of Good Counsel High School, Mumbai
 Queen Mary School, Mumbai
 Shanti Sadan School
 Stella Maris English School
 St. Anne's School (Pune)
 St. Joseph's Convent High School, Mumbai
 St. Joseph’s Technical Institute, Pune
 St. Mary's High School SSC
 St. Mary's School, Pune
 St. Mary's School, Mumbai
 St. Mary's School, Sangamner
 St. Peter's School, Panchgani
 St. Stanislaus High School
 St. Teresa's High School, Charni Road
 St. Theresa's Boys High School
 St Thomas' School (Pune)
 St. Vincent's High School
 St. Xavier's Boys' Academy, Mumbai
 St. Xavier's High School, Fort
 St. Xavier's High School, Nashik
 St. Xavier's High School, Nerul
 St. Xavier's School, Kolhapur
 Vidya Bhavan High School and Junior College

Manipur 

 Don Bosco College, Maram
 Don Bosco High School (Imphal)
 Little Flower School, Imphal
 St. Joseph's School, Imphal

Meghalaya 

 Christian Girls' Higher Secondary School, Tura

Mizoram 

 Bethel Mission School

Madhya Pradesh

 Campion School, Bhopal
 Christ Church Boys' Senior Secondary School
 St. Aloysius Senior Secondary School, Jabalpur
 St. Mary's Convent School, Ujjain
 St. Mary's School Harda
 St. Raphael's Girls' Higher Secondary School

Odisha 

 Blessed Sacrament High School Puri
 Carmel School, Rourkela
 St. Joseph's Convent School, Rourkela
 St. Mary's Higher Secondary School, Jharsuguda
 St. Mary's School, Jajpur Road, Odisha
 St Paul's School, Rourkela
 Stewart School, Cuttack

Punjab 

 Christ Jyoti Convent School, Sultanpur Lodhi
 St. Lawrence School, Patiala
 St. Mary's School, Patiala
 St. Peter's Academy, Patiala
 St. Xaviers International School

Rajasthan 

 St. Anselm's North City School, Jaipur
 St. Anselm's Pink City Sr. Sec. School, Jaipur
 St. Edmund's School Malviya Nagar Jaipur
 St. Mary's High School, Mt. Abu
 St. Paul School, Barmer
 St. Xavier's School, Behror
 St. Xavier's School, Bhiwadi
 St. Xavier's School, Jaipur
 St. Xavier's School, Nevta

Tamil Nadu 

 Alphonsa Matriculation Higher Secondary School
 Alvernia Matriculation Higher Secondary School
 Avila Convent
 Bentinck School, Vepery
 Breeks Memorial School
 C.S.I. Ewart Matriculation Higher Secondary School
 Campion Anglo-Indian Higher Secondary School
 Carmel Garden Matriculation Higher Secondary School
 Carmel Higher Secondary School
 Christ Church Anglo-Indian Higher Secondary School
 Christ CMI Central School, Anjugramam
 Church of South India Boys Higher Secondary School
 De Britto Higher Secondary School
 Lisieux Matriculation Higher Secondary School
 M. C. C. Higher Secondary School
 Samaritan Residential Schools
 Saviour Jesus Matriculation Higher Secondary School
 Scott Christian Higher Secondary School
 St. Mary's Anglo-Indian Higher Secondary School
 St. Mary's Higher Secondary School, Dindigul
 St. Mary’s Higher Secondary School, Madurai
 St. Mary's Higher Secondary School, Vikramasingapuram
 St. Matthias Anglo Indian Higher Secondary School
 St. Patrick's Anglo Indian Higher Secondary School
 St. Paul's Matriculation Higher Secondary School
 St. Theresa's Girls' Higher Secondary School
 St. Xavier's Higher Secondary School, Palayamkottai
 St. Xavier's Higher Secondary School, Thoothukudi
 Velankanni Matriculation And Higher Secondary School
 YMCA Brown Matriculation Higher Secondary School

Telangana 

 All Saints High School
 Carmel Convent High School, Mancherial
 Carmel School, Chintal Cheru
 Little Flower High School, Hyderabad
 Loyola Academy, Secunderabad
 Loyola High School, Karimnagar
 St. Ann's High School, Secunderabad
 St. George's Grammar School (Hyderabad)
 St. Mary Joseph's High School, Hyderabad
 St. Mary's High School, Secunderabad
 St. Patrick's High School, Secunderabad
 St. Paul's High School, Hyderabad
 St. Thomas (SPG) Boys' High School
 St. Xavier's High School, Suryapet

Tripura 

 St Paul's School, Agartala

Uttar Pradesh 

 Assisi Convent Inter College
 Bethany Convent School, Allahabad
 Cathedral School of Lucknow
 Christ the King College, Jhansi
 Girls' High School and College, Allahabad
 Loreto Convent Lucknow
 Mahanagar Boys' Inter College Lucknow
 Our Lady of Fatima High School, Aligarh
 Somerville School, Greater Noida
 St. Antony's Inter College, Lucknow
 St Fidelis College (Lucknow, India)
 St. John's School, Marhauli, Varanasi
 St. John's School, Varanasi
 St. Joseph's Convent School, Varanasi
 St. Mary's Academy, Meerut
 St. Mary's Convent Inter College, Prayagraj
 St. Paul's College, Agra
 St. Peter's College, Agra
 St Thomas College, Lucknow

Uttarakhand 

 Campus School, GBPUA&T
 Convent of Jesus and Mary, Waverley, Mussoorie
 St. Mary's Convent High School, Nainital
 Woodstock School

West Bengal 

 Assembly of God Church School
 Auxilium Convent School
 Bishop Morrow School
 Calcutta Boys' School
 Calcutta Girls' High School
 Carmel Convent High School, Durgapur
 Carmel School, Kolkata
 Convent of Jesus and Mary, Ranaghat
 Don Bosco School, Bandel
 Loreto Convent, Asansol
 Loreto Convent, Darjeeling
 Loreto Schools, Kolkata
 Mount Hermon School, Darjeeling
 Scottish Church Collegiate School
 Scottish Church College
 St. Francis Xavier School, Kolkata
 St. James' School (Kolkata)
 St. Joseph's School - North Point, Darjeeling
 St. Lawrence High School, Kolkata
 St. Michael's School B zone unit
 St. Michael's School, Durgapur
 St. Paul's School, Darjeeling
 St. Patrick's Higher Secondary School
 St. Roberts School, Darjeeling
 St. Thomas' Church School, Howrah
 St. Xavier’s School, Raiganj
 St Thomas School, Kolkata
 St. Vincent's High and Technical School
 St. Xavier's School, Durgapur
 St. Xavier's School, Burdwan
 St. Xavier's Collegiate School

Union territories

Andaman and Nicobar Islands

Chandigarh

 Chandigarh Baptist School
 St. Anne's Convent School, Chandigarh
 St. John's High School, Chandigarh
 St. Mary's School, Chandigarh
 St. Stephen's School, Chandigarh

Dadra and Nagar Haveli

Daman and Diu

National Capital Territory of Delhi 

 Convent of Jesus and Mary, Delhi
 Don Bosco School (Alaknanda, New Delhi)
 Faith Academy, Delhi
 Holy Child Auxilium School
 Holy Cross School (Najafgarh)
 Loreto Convent School, Delhi
 Mater Dei School, New Delhi
 Mount St. Mary's School, Delhi
 Presentation Convent Senior Secondary School
 St. Columba's School, Delhi
 St. Francis De Sales School (New Delhi)
 St. Mark's Senior Secondary Public School
 St. Paul's School, New Delhi
 St. Thomas' School (New Delhi)
 St. Xavier's School, Delhi
 St. Xavier's School, Rohini

Lakshadweep

Pondicherry

See also 

 List of schools in India
 :Category:Catholic schools in India
 :Category:Catholic secondary schools in India

India
 
Christian